ACORN International is a federation of member-based community organizations that is active in the UK, Canada, Peru, Argentina, Mexico, India, Kenya, the Dominican Republic, Honduras, South Korea, Czech Republic and Italy.  The membership currently numbers approximately 55,000 families.

History 
It was created in 2004 by members and staff of the Association of Community Organizations for Reform Now (ACORN). The Founder and Chief Organizer is Wade Rathke. The headquarters of ACORN International are in New Orleans and Toronto.  Much of the capacity outside of the organizing areas is provided by interns and volunteers that have come from George Brown College (Toronto), Carleton University (Ottawa), York University (Toronto), Georgia State University, the University of Edinburgh (Scotland), and many others.

ACORN International is currently undertaking research for an additional focus on the interest rates, transparency, and role (if any) of micro-finance in poverty reduction.  A white paper, along the lines of those developed for the Remittance Justice Campaign, entitled "Mega Troubles for Micro-Finance" was released in the summer of 2011 demanding among other things that no additional donor or government money be invested in micro-finance since it has failed to reduce poverty according to both ACORN International's research and research done by the Abdul Latif Jameel Poverty Action Lab.  Responses received from a number of international development agencies such as the World Bank and UK AID have been in agreement with many of the criticisms of microfinance industries included in the report, but do not agree with the report's final recommendations of eliminating all public funding of microfinance among other suggestions.

Campaigns 
Since its creation it has focused on a wide variety of local campaigns and initiatives, including fighting for potable water, paved roads, schools and parks in San Juan Laragancho in Lima, Peru, working to organize ragpickers and hawkers in India's mega-slums, and working to raise the standards for tenants in cities across Canada.  Much of ACORN International's work focuses on mega-slums like Dharavi (Mumbai), San Juan Laragancho (Lima), La Matanza (Buenos Aires), Korogocho (Nairobi), the ITO community (Delhi), Col. Ramon Amalia Amador (Tegucigalpa), and Choloma (San Pedro Sula) among others.

ACORN International's major projects have included the Commonwealth Games campaign  and the Remittance Justice campaign.

Well known efforts of ACORN International affiliates have included the Dharavi Project in Mumbai, the “Live Green” joint project with the City of Toronto, the Green Worker project in Delhi in the ITO displacement community, Club ACORN in Buenos Aires which is an after school program  for children, and the successful and ongoing campaigns to win potable water in Col. Amador, San Juan Laragancho, the Neza in Mexico City, and Cholmo.

Influence 
Since 2014, groups in the United Kingdom in Bristol, Brighton, Weston-super-Mare, Ceredigion, Birmingham, Liverpool, Manchester, Sheffield, Leeds and Newcastle have operated under the ACORN name. They operate similarly to trade unions but with community membership.

References

External links 
 ACORN International site
 ACORN Canada site
ACORN United Kingdom site

Community organizations
Economic development organizations in the United States
Organizations based in New Orleans